Stomphastis crotonis is a moth of the family Gracillariidae. It is known from South Africa and Namibia.

The larvae feed on Croton menyharthii. They mine the leaves of their host plant. The mine has the form of a moderate, irregular, more or less oblong, transparent blotch mine which starts as a narrow gallery.

References

Stomphastis
Moths of Africa
Insects of Namibia